The 1997 Five Nations Championship was the sixty-eighth series of the rugby union Five Nations Championship. Including the previous incarnations as the Home Nations and Five Nations, this was the hundred-and-third series of the northern hemisphere rugby union championship. Ten matches were played over five weekends from 18 January to 15 March, the crucial match being in Weekend 4 where England inexplicably threw away a 20–6 lead at Twickenham with quarter of the match to go and were pipped by France. France went on to win their first Grand Slam in ten years; England defeated the other Home Nations by large margins to win the Triple Crown. It was the last time that France played at the Parc des Princes, in Paris. Since then, the French team has been playing in the Stade de France, also in Paris.

Participants
The teams involved were:

Squads

Table

Results

Week 1

Week 2

Week 3

Week 4

Week 5

References

External links
1997 Five Nations Championship at ESPN

1997 rugby union tournaments for national teams
1997
 
1996–97 in Irish rugby union
1996–97 in English rugby union
1996–97 in Welsh rugby union
1996–97 in Scottish rugby union
1996–97 in French rugby union
Five Nations
Five Nations
Five Nations